Simple Pleasure is the fourth studio album by Tindersticks. It was released in 1999 on Island Records. The album marked a major departure for the band, as it began to adapt more soul and jazz influences than on their previous recordings.

The album was a remarkable success in Greece, charting at #4 in the international artist chart. It peaked at #36 in the UK Albums chart. The album was not released in the US.

Critical reception
The Independent wrote that "if you don't mind the sound of someone crooning while drinking a glass of water, you'll find this record a gem: a long, dark night ... with soul."

Track listing
 "Can We Start Again?"  – 3:51
 "If You're Looking for a Way Out"  – 5:06
 "Pretty Words"  – 3:18
 "From the Inside"  – 2:54
 "If She's Torn"  – 5:43
 "Before You Close Your Eyes"  – 6:15
 "(You Take) This Heart of Mine"  – 4:23
 "I Know That Loving"  – 5:48
 "CF GF"  – 6:10

Bonus tracks from the 2018 vinyl expanded edition:

 "Twisted Wheel" (demo) – 2:55
 "One Way Street"  – 2:46
 "(You're a) Pussycat"  – 5:05 
 "If She's Torn" (demo) – 5:44
 "A Little Time"  – 1:54
 "Pretty Words" (demo) – 3:59
 "(You Take) This Heart of Mine" (demo) – 2:31
 "I Know That Loving (Adrian Sherwood Remix)"  – 3:56
 "David's Soul" (demo) – 2:34
 "If You're Looking for a Way Out" (demo) – 5:10
 "Puppy Fat"  – 10:50
 "CF GF" (demo) – 5:26

References

1999 albums
Tindersticks albums
Island Records albums